William Crawford Ruger (January 30, 1824 Bridgewater, Oneida County, New York – January 14, 1892 Syracuse, Onondaga County, New York) was an American lawyer and politician from New York. He was Chief Judge of the New York Court of Appeals from 1883 until his death.

Life
He was the son of Sophia (Brown) Ruger and John Ruger (d. 1855), an attorney who practiced at Bridgewater, but removed to Syracuse, N.Y., in 1847. William C. Ruger was educated at Bridgewater Academy, then studied law with his father, was admitted to the bar in 1845, and commenced practice in Bridgewater.

In 1853, he removed to Syracuse, N.Y., formed a partnership with his father. On May 2, 1860, he married Harriet Prosser (1836–1909), a daughter of State Senator Erastus S. Prosser, and their son was Crawford Prosser Ruger (1862–1907).

William C. Ruger was a delegate to the 1872 Democratic National Convention. In November 1882, he was elected on the Democratic ticket Chief Judge of the Court of Appeals, and died in office in 1892. He was buried at Oakwood Cemetery (Syracuse, New York).

State Senator William Ruger (d. 1843) was his uncle.

Sources
 Political Graveyard
 Listing of Court of Appeals judges, with portrait
 Obit in NYT on January 15, 1892

1824 births
1892 deaths
Chief Judges of the New York Court of Appeals
Lawyers from Syracuse, New York
People from Oneida County, New York
Politicians from Syracuse, New York
19th-century American judges
19th-century American lawyers